Banpo  is an archaeological site discovered in 1953 by Shi Xingbang, and located in the Yellow River Valley just east of Xi'an, China. It  contains the remains of several well organized  Neolithic settlements, like Jiangzhai, carbon dated to 6700–5600 years ago. The houses were circular, built of mud and wood with overhanging thatched roofs. They sat on low foundations. There appear to be communal burial areas.

Banpo is the type site associated with Yangshao Culture. Archaeological sites with similarities to the first phase at Banpo are considered to be part of the “Banpo phase” (5th millennium BC) of the Yangshao culture. Banpo was excavated from 1954 to 1957.

The settlement was surrounded by a moat, with the graves and pottery kilns located outside the moat perimeter. The houses were supported by timber poles and had steeply pitched thatched roofs.

According to the Marxist paradigm of archaeology that was prevalent in the China during the time of the excavation of the site, Banpo was considered to be a matriarchal society; however, new research contradicts this claim and the Marxist paradigm is gradually being phased out in modern Chinese archaeological research. Currently, little can be said of the religious or political structure from these ruins from the archaeological evidence.

The site is now home to the Xi'an Banpo Museum, built in 1957 to preserve the archaeological collection.

See also
 Banpo symbols
 Sanxingdui
 Cishan culture
 Nanzhuangtou
 Jiangzhai
 Yangguanzhai

Footnotes

References
 Allan, Sarah (ed), The Formation of Chinese Civilization: An Archaeological Perspective, 
 Chang, Kwang-chih. The Archaeology of Ancient China, 

Populated places established in the 7th millennium BC
1953 archaeological discoveries
History of Xi'an
Archaeological sites in China
Neolithic cultures of China
Neolithic settlements
Former populated places in China
Archaeological type sites
Major National Historical and Cultural Sites in Shaanxi
5th-millennium BC establishments
Tourist attractions in Xi'an
Yangshao culture